Gangoobai is 2013 Bollywood drama film, produced by the National Film Development Corporation of India and directed by Priya Krishnaswamy. It stars Sarita Joshi in the lead role as Gangoobai.

The story is about an elderly maid servant who works hard to achieve her dream of an extremely expensive Gara sari and changes the lives of people she interacts with while in Mumbai to buy the sari. The story is strikingly similar to the 1958 novel mrs. hariis goes to paris. The film was premiered at MAMI 2012, in the New Faces in Indian Cinema section; the South Asian Film Festival in Canada; the Hanoi International Film Festival in Vietnam and the IFFI 2012.

Cast 

 Sarita Joshi as Gangoobai
 Purab Kohli as Waman Ponkshe
 Mita Vashisht as Daksha
 Rajendranath Zutshi as Rohan
 Nidhi Sunil as Monisha
 Ankita Shrivastav as Santripti 
 Aparna Kanekar as Malanbai (Gangoobai's friend in village) 
 Gopi Desai as Mrs. Tahiliani  
 Behram Rana as Jamshyd Mistry 
 Rushad Rana as Khushru Mistry 
 Ardra Swaroop as Simone's assistant

Critical response 
The Times of India gave it 2.5 stars out of 5 and the reviewer summarizes it as "Gangoobai doesn't sweep your heart away, but leaves you with some sweet, feel-good moments." MiD DAY gave the movie 3.5 out of 5 stars and says: "[T]his heartwarming film subtly teaches us something about our generation." The reviewer at Live Mint called it "a fairy tale".

References

External links 
 

2012 films
Indian drama films
2010s Hindi-language films
2010s Marathi-language films
2012 drama films
Hindi-language drama films
2012 multilingual films
Indian multilingual films